The Merchants Bank Building is a historic commercial building at 32 Westminster Street in downtown Providence, Rhode Island.  It is a six-story brownstone structure, designed by Alpheus C. Morse and Clifton A. Hall and built in 1855–57.  When built, this Italianate structure was one of the first buildings of Providence's financial district, and is now surrounded by much larger modern skyscrapers.  It is architecturally reminiscent of Roman palazzos, with an arcaded ground floor, second-level windows topped by alternating segmented-arch and triangular pediments, and a projecting cornice with dentil moulding and modillions.  The building served as the headquarters of the Merchants Bank until it merged with Providence National Bank in 1920.

The building was listed on the National Register of Historic Places in 1977.

See also
National Register of Historic Places listings in Providence, Rhode Island

References

Italianate architecture in Rhode Island
Buildings and structures in Providence, Rhode Island
Commercial buildings on the National Register of Historic Places in Rhode Island
Bank buildings on the National Register of Historic Places in Rhode Island
Commercial buildings completed in 1855
National Register of Historic Places in Providence, Rhode Island
Historic district contributing properties in Rhode Island